Below is a complete list of the Belarusian records in swimming, which are ratified by the Swimming Federation of Belarus.

Long Course (50 m)

Men

Women

Mixed relay

Short Course (25 m)

Men

Women

Mixed relay

References

External links
Belarus Aquatics web site
Belarusian records page 10 April 2022 updated
Belarusian Records swimrankings.net 9 December 2022 updated

Belarus
Records
Swimming
Swimming